Equipe 84 were an Italian Beat band formed in 1964 in Modena. The name translates as Team 84, and it was originally suggested by a friend of the band, Pier Farri. 'Equipe' was thought to be a word that would resonate more easily outside of their home country, and though the origin of '84' is unclear, it is presumed to have been the total age of the members of the band at the moment of its inception.

Originally formed by Maurizio Vandelli (vocals, guitar), Victor Sogliani (bass), Alfio Cantarella (drums) and Franco Ceccarelli (guitar), Equipe 84 recorded their debut album in 1965 with the label Vedette, before signing a more lucrative agreement with Dischi Ricordi. From 1966 Equipe 84 scored a number of hit singles in the Italian charts, including "29 settembre" and "Io ho in mente te" (an italian rendition of the folk duo Ian & Sylvia's "You Were on My Mind"). In 1967, the band was featured in Mariano Laurenti's film I ragazzi di bandiera gialla.

In 1970, Ceccarelli left the band to pursue a solo career. In the same year Cantarella was charged with possession of illegal drugs – a predicament that would keep him away from the band for two years. After hiring temporary replacements in the form of keyboardist Dario Baldan Bembo and PFM drummer Franz Di Cioccio, Vandelli and Sogliani embarked on an ambitious project, recording the strongly influenced prog-rock album ID and briefly changing the name of the band to 'Nuova Equipe 84'. In 1973, with the return of Cantarella, the band left Dischi Ricordi and signed for Alfredo Rossi's label Ariston Records, returning to a more conventional sound with the album Dr. Jekyll & Mr. Hyde. The band, however, stirred further controversy with the single "Clinica Fior di Loto", a blatant invitation to vote for the Italian Socialist Party at the upcoming general elections.

Following a decline in popularity, Equipe 84 officially disbanded in 1977. In the mid-1980s Sogliani and Ceccarelli attempted a short-lived reunion, which resulted in the band's final album, "Un amore vale l'altro" (1989).

Personnel
 Maurizio Vandelli (1963–1977): lead vocals, guitar, keyboards
 Victor Sogliani (1963–1977 and 1984–1995): vocals, bass
 Alfio Cantarella (1963–1970 and 1973–1977): drums
 Franco Ceccarelli (1963–1970 and 1984–2012): vocals, guitar
 Mike Shepstone (1970): drums
 Franz Di Cioccio (1970–1971): drums
 Ruggero Stefani (1972): drums
 Paolo Siani (1976–1977): drums
 Dario Baldan Bembo (1970–1972): keyboards
 Gagliardone Thomas (1972–1977): keyboards
 Roberto Poltronieri (1995–2006): bass

Discography
Albums
 1965 - Equipe 84 (Vedette, VPA 8051)
 1966 - Io ho in mente te (Dischi Ricordi, MRL 6053)
 1968 - Stereoequipe (Dischi Ricordi, SMRL 6060)
 1970 - ID (Dischi Ricordi, SMRL 6072)
 1971 - Casa mia (Dischi Ricordi, SMRL 6086)
 1973 - Dr. Jekyll & Mr. Hyde (Ariston Records, Ar 12107)
 1974 - Sacrificio (Ariston Records, Ar 12134)
 1989 - Un amore vale l'altro (Rose Red, Rose 5031)

Singles
 1964 - "Liberi d'amare" / "Canarino va" 
 1964 - "Papà e mammà" / "Quel che ti ho dato" 
 1965 - "Ora puoi tornare" / "Prima di cominciare"
 1965 - "Notte senza fine" / "Se credi a quello che..."
 1965 - "La fine del libro" / "Cominciamo a suonare le chitarre" 
 1965 - "Sei già di un altro" / "La den da da"
 1965 - "Liberi d'amare" / "Non guardarmi così" 
 1966 - "Un giorno tu mi cercherai" / "L'antisociale"
 1966 - "Mi fai bene" / "Goodbye My Love"
 1966 - "Io ho in mente te" / Resta"
 1966 - "Bang Bang" / "Auschwitz"
 1967 - "29 September" / "E' dall'amore che nasce l'uomo"
 1967 - "Nel cuore, nell'anima" / "Ladro"
 1968 - "Un anno" / "Nel ristorante di Alice"
 1968 - "Un angelo blu" / "Nella terra dei sogni"
 1969 - "Tutta mia la città" / "Cominciava così" 
 1969 - "Pomeriggio: ore 6" / "E poi..." 
 1970 - "Il sapone, la pistola, la chitarra e altre meraviglie" / "Devo andare"
 1971 - "4 Marzo 1943" / "Padre e figlio"
 1971 - "Casa mia" / "Buffa"
 1971 - "Una giornata al mare" / "Quel giorno"
 1971 - "Pullman" / "Non si può"
 1973 - "Diario" / "Senza senso"
 1973 - "Clinica Fior di Loto" / "Meglio"
 1974 - "Mercante senza fiori" / "Sigaretta e via"
 1974 - "Risvegliarsi un mattino" / "Se c'è"
 1975 - "sogni senza fine" / "Mediazione"
 1975 - "Vai, amore vai" / "Mr. Playboy"
 1977 - "Opera d'amore" / "Anguilla Rock"
 1989 - "La lunga linea retta" / "Rosa"

Bibliography
 Franco Ceccarelli, Io ho in mente te: Storia dell'Equipe 84, Zelig, Bologna, 1996

References

External links
 Maurizio Vandelli's Official Site

Italian rock music groups
Italian pop music groups
Musical groups established in 1964
Musical groups disestablished in 1989
Beat groups